Harry G. Summers Jr. (May 6, 1932 – November 14, 1999) is best known as the author of an analysis of the Vietnam War, On Strategy:  A Critical Analysis of the Vietnam War (1982). An infantry colonel in the US Army, he had served as a squad leader in the Korean War and as a battalion and corps operations officer in the Vietnam War. Summers was also an instructor and Distinguished Fellow at the Strategic Studies Institute at the US Army War College in Carlisle, Pennsylvania, and served on the negotiation team for the United States at the end of the Vietnam War.

Aside from his books, Summers wrote a syndicated national newspaper column on national security affairs for the Los Angeles Times and was the editor of Vietnam Magazine. He was also a frequent speaker at colleges, lectures, and debates.

During Operation Desert Storm, Summers served as a color commentator and analyst on the ongoing live network news broadcasts and for a time became a familiar face to the television viewers. In 1992, he wrote a book on the Gulf War, On Strategy II: A Critical Analysis of the Gulf War.

Selected bibliography

Books
On Strategy: A Critical Analysis of the Vietnam War, Harry G. Summers, Presidio press, 1982,  (225 pages)
On Strategy II: A Critical Analysis of the Gulf War, Harry G. Summers, Dell, 1992,  (302 pages)
Historical Atlas of the Vietnam War, Harry G Summers, Stanley Karnow, Houghton Mifflin Co, 1995 ,  (224 pages)
The New World Strategy: A Military Policy for America's Future, Harry G. Summers, Simon & Schuster, 1995,  (270 pages)
Persian Gulf War Almanac, Harry G. Summers, Facts on File, 1995,  (301 pages)
The Vietnam War Almanac, Harry G. Summers, Presidio/Ballantine Books, 1999,  (432 pages)
Korean War Almanac, Harry G. Summers Jr., Replica Books, 1999,  (348 pages)
On Strategy: The Vietnam War in Context, Harry G Summers Jr., Lightning Source Inc, 2002,  (152 pages)

Book contributions
Desert Storm, edited by Military History Magazine, with Foreword By Harry Summers Jr., Howell Press, 1991,  (176 pages)
Phoenix and the Birds of prey: Counterinsurgency and Counterterrorism in Vietnam; Mark Moyar, Contributor Harry G. Summers Jr., Published by U of Nebraska Press, 2007 ,  (496 pages)

Other
Principles of War: The American Genesis; Reprint of Major (later Colonel) Edward S. Johnston's 1934 article, The Science of War with introduction and commentary by Colonel Wallace P. Franz, Infantry and Colonel Harry G. Summers Jr., Infantry.

External links

Tribute to Harry Summers on Clausewitz.com
Six-page "Conversations with History; Institute of International Studies, UC Berkeley" interview with Harry Summers
 (archived from the original on 2006-12-12)
Small Wars Journal review of On Strategy

1932 births
1999 deaths
American military writers
United States Army officers
United States Army personnel of the Korean War
United States Army personnel of the Vietnam War
United States Army War College faculty
20th-century American non-fiction writers